The 1964 Chicago Bears season was their 45th regular season completed in the National Football League. The team finished with a 5–9 record, earning them a sixth-place finish in the NFL Western Conference. It was a downfall from winning their eighth league title the previous December.

Running back Willie Galimore and wide receiver John Farrington were killed in an automobile accident on July 27; Galimore's Volkswagen left the road on a curve and rolled, a few miles from the team's training camp at St. Joseph's College in Rensselaer, Indiana.

Roster

Schedule

Game summaries

Week 1 at Packers

Week 12

Standings

References

Chicago Bears
Chicago Bears seasons
Chicago Bears